The 1921–22 PCHA season was the 11th season of the professional men's ice hockey Pacific Coast Hockey Association league. Season play ran from December 5, 1921, until February 24, 1922. The season was enlarged to 24 games per team. The Seattle Metropolitans club would be regular-season PCHA champions, but would lose the play-off with Vancouver Millionaires.

League business
The league introduced the penalty shot rule this season to counter deliberate fouls when a player had a clear goal-scoring opportunity. Three dots, 35 feet from each net were painted on the ice from which players would shoot on the goalkeeper.

Play started two weeks earlier to accommodate the playoffs against the Western Canada Hockey League.

Regular season

Lester Patrick twice subbed for goaltender Norman "Hec" Fowler when Fowler was sent off for fighting. His style of getting to his knees to make a save earned him the nickname of the Praying Colonel.

Ernie "Moose" Johnson played the last game in his career on January 18. He scored the final goal in his career on January 13.

Frank Foyston had the best one-game performance of the season, scoring five goals against Vancouver on January 11. Jack Adams though led the league in scoring with 25 goals in 24 games.

Final standings
Note: W = Wins, L = Losses, T = Ties, GF= Goals For, GA = Goals against
Teams that qualified for the playoffs are highlighted in bold

Source: Coleman(1966).

Playoffs

The Millionaires won the two-game total-goals series against Seattle 1-0, 1-0 (2-0)

The Millionaires then played against the Western Canada Hockey League champion Regina in a two-game total-goals series for the right to play the NHL champion. Vancouver won the series 1-2, 4-0 (5-2).

The Millionaires then played the Toronto St. Pats in the 1922 Stanley Cup Finals. The St. Pats would win the best-of-five series 3-4, 1-2, 0-3, 6-0, 5-1 to win their only Stanley Cup.

Schedule and results

Source: Coleman(1966).

Player statistics

Goaltending averages

Source: Coleman(1966).

Scoring leaders

See also
1921–22 NHL season
1921–22 WCHL season

References

Notes

Bibliography
 

 
Pacific Coast Hockey Association seasons
2
PCHA